Charles Damoi Mandella Banga (born 17 July 1981) is an Ivorian footballer, who currently plays as a left midfielder for FCV Dender in Belgium.

Career 
Banga began his career in 2001 with Toumodi FC and joined in July 2005 the Belgian club R.O.C. de Charleroi-Marchienne. He played 78 games, scoring 12 goals. He moved on 5 January 2009 from R.O.C. de Charleroi-Marchienne to FCV Dender.

References

External links 
 

1981 births
Living people
Ivorian footballers
F.C.V. Dender E.H. players
R. Olympic Charleroi Châtelet Farciennes players
Toumodi FC players
Footballers from Abidjan
Association football midfielders